is a town and a former municipality in the district of Wittenberg, in Saxony-Anhalt, Germany. Since 1 January 2011, it has been part of the town Oranienbaum-Wörlitz. It is situated on the left bank of the Elbe, east of Dessau.

The historic parks of Wörlitz are included into the Dessau-Wörlitz Garden Realm, one of the World Heritage Sites, designated in 2000.

References
 Wörlitz. In: Meyers Lexicon. 4th edition. Volume 16, Bibliographical Institute, Leipzig 1885–1892, p. 746

External links

 Homepage of Wörlitz-Information (German)

Towns in Saxony-Anhalt
Former municipalities in Saxony-Anhalt
Oranienbaum-Wörlitz
Duchy of Anhalt